This bibliography of anthropology lists some notable publications in the field of anthropology, including its various subfields. It is not comprehensive and continues to be developed. It also includes a number of works that are not by anthropologists but are relevant to the field, such as literary theory, sociology, psychology, and philosophical anthropology.

Anthropology is the study of humanity. Described as "the most humanistic of sciences and the most scientific of the humanities", it is considered to bridge the natural sciences, social sciences and humanities,  and draws upon a wide range of related fields. In North America, anthropology is traditionally divided into four major subdisciplines: biological anthropology, sociocultural anthropology, linguistic anthropology and archaeology. Other academic traditions use less broad definitions, where one or more of these fields are considered separate, but related, disciplines.

Sociocultural anthropology

Chronological bibliography

From the beginnings to 1899 
 Georg Forster, A Voyage Round the World, 1777
 Immanuel Kant, Anthropology from a Pragmatic Point of View, 1798
 Jacob Burckhardt, The Civilization of the Renaissance in Italy, 1860
 Johann Jakob Bachofen, Myth, Religion, and Mother Right: Selected Writings of J.J. Bachofen, 1861 (English translation: 1967)
 Edward Burnett Tylor, Primitive Culture, 1871
 Lewis H. Morgan, Systems of Consanguinity and Affinity of the Human Family (1871), Ancient Society, 1877
 John Wesley Powell, The Arid Lands (originally published as Report on the Lands of the Arid Regions of the United States), 1878
 Adolf Bastian, Der Völkergedanke im Aufbau einer Wissenschaft vom Menschen, 1881 (German; not yet translated into English)
 Friedrich Engels, The Origin of the Family, Private Property and the State, 1884
 Anténor Firmin, The Equality of the Human Races, 1885
 James George Frazer, The Golden Bough, 1890
 Edvard Westermarck, The History of Human Marriage, 1891
James Mooney, The Ghost-dance religion and the Sioux outbreak of 1890. US Bureau of American Ethnology, 1892-3 Annual Report, 2 vols., 1896.

1900s and 1910s 
 Henri Hubert and Marcel Mauss, A General Theory of Magic, 1902 (republished by Mauss in 1950)
 Émile Durkheim, Primitive Classification, 1903
 Max Weber, The Protestant Ethic and the Spirit of Capitalism, 1905 (English translation: 1930)
 Arnold van Gennep, The Rites of Passage, 1909
 Lucien Lévy-Bruhl, How Natives Think, 1910
 Franz Boas, The Mind of Primitive Man, 1911
 Fritz Graebner, Methode der Ethnologie, 1911 (in German, not yet translated into English)
 Émile Durkheim, The Elementary Forms of the Religious Life, 1912
 Sigmund Freud, Totem and Taboo, 1913
 W. H. R. Rivers, Kinship and Social Organisation, 1914
 Max Weber, The Religion of China: Confucianism and Taoism, 1915 (English translation: 1951)

1920s and 1930s 
 Bronisław Malinowski, Argonauts of the Western Pacific, 1922
 Alfred Radcliffe-Brown, The Andaman Islanders, 1922
 W. H. R. Rivers, Medicine, Magic and Religion, 1924
 Marcel Mauss, The Gift, 1925
 Maurice Halbwachs, On Collective Memory, 1925
 Franz Boas, Primitive Art, 1927
 Bronisław Malinowski, Sex and Repression in Savage Society, 1927
 Margaret Mead, Coming of Age in Samoa, 1928
 Franz Boas, Anthropology and Modern Life, 1928
 Richard Thurnwald, Die menschliche Gesellschaft in ihren ethnosoziologischen Grundlagen, 1931–35 (German; not yet translated into English)
 Ruth Benedict, Patterns of Culture, 1934
 Robert Lowie, The Crow Indians, 1935
 Zora Neale Hurston, Mules and Men, 1935
 Bronisław Malinowski, Coral Gardens and Their Magic: A Study of the Methods of Tilling the Soil and of Agricultural Rites in the Trobriand Islands, 1935
 E. E. Evans-Pritchard, Witchcraft, Oracles and Magic among the Azande, 1937 (abridged edition published in 1976)
 Leo Frobenius, African Genesis: Folk Tales and Myths of Africa, 1937
 Johan Huizinga, Homo Ludens: A Study of the Play-Element in Culture, 1938
 Jomo Kenyatta, Facing Mount Kenya, 1938
 Zora Neale Hurston, Tell My Horse, 1938
 Wilhelm Schmidt, The Culture Historical Method of Ethnology, 1939

1940s and 1950s 
 Franz Boas, Race, Language and Culture, 1940
 E. E. Evans-Pritchard, The Nuer, 1940
 Meyer Fortes and E. E. Evans-Pritchard, African Political Systems, 1940
 Melville J. Herskovits, The Myth of The Negro Past, 1941
 Karl Polanyi, The Great Transformation, 1944
 Ruth Benedict, The Chrysanthemum and the Sword, 1946
 Ernesto de Martino, Il mondo magico: Prolegomeni allo studio del magismo, 1948
 Fei Xiaotong, From the Soil: The Foundations of Chinese Society, 1948 (English translation: 1992)
 Clyde Kluckhohn, Mirror for Man: The Relation of Anthropology to Modern Life, 1949
 Tarak Chandra Das,  Bengal Famine(1943) : As Revealed in a Survey of the Destitutes in Calcutta, 1949  
 Alfred L. Kroeber, The Nature of Culture, 1952
 Laura Bohannan, Return to Laughter, 1954
 Edmund Leach, Political Systems of Highland Burma: A Study of Kachin Social Structure, 1954
 Claude Lévi-Strauss, Tristes Tropiques, 1955
 Ralph Linton, The Tree of Culture, 1955 (posthumously)
 Julian Steward, Theory of Culture Change: The Methodology of Multilinear Evolution, 1955
 E. E. Evans-Pritchard, Nuer Religion, 1956
 Georges Balandier, Ambiguous Africa: Cultures in Collision, 1957
 Richard Hoggart, The Uses of Literacy: Aspects of Working-Class Life, 1957
 Leslie White, The Evolution of Culture: The Development of Civilization to the Fall of Rome, 1959
 Claude Lévi-Strauss, Structural Anthropology, 1958
 Raymond Williams, Culture and Society, 1958
 Alfred Métraux, Voodoo in Haiti, 1958
 Fredrik Barth, Political Leadership Among Swat Pathans, 1959
 C. P. Snow, The Two Cultures, 1959

1960s and 1970s 
 R. G. Lienhardt, Divinity and Experience: the Religion of the Dinka, 1961
 Robert Lowie, Empathy: Or 'Seeing from Within''', 1960
 Frantz Fanon, The Wretched of the Earth, 1961 (English translation: 1963)
 Colin Turnbull, The Forest People, 1961
 Claude Lévi-Strauss, The Savage Mind, 1962 (English translation: 1966)
 Clifford Geertz, Agricultural Involution: The Processes of Ecological Change in Indonesia, 1963
 Peter Worsley, The Third World, 1964
 Max Gluckman, Politics, Law and Ritual in Tribal Society, 1965
 Mary Douglas, Purity and Danger: An Analysis of Concepts of Pollution and Taboo, 1966
 Louis Dumont, Homo Hierarchicus, 1966
 George Devereux, From Anxiety to Method in the Behavioral Sciences, 1967
 Victor Turner, The Forest of Symbols, 1967
 Napoleon Chagnon, Yanomamö: The Fierce People, 1968
 Joseph Campbell, The Flight of the Wild Gander, 1968
 Fredrik Barth, Ethnic Groups and Boundaries, 1969
 Victor Turner, The Ritual Process: Structure and Anti-Structure, 1969
 Mary Douglas, Natural Symbols, 1970
 Gregory Bateson, Steps to an Ecology of Mind, 1972
 H. R. Bernard and P. J. Pelto, Technology and Social Change, 1972
 Pierre Bourdieu, Outline of a Theory of Practice, 1972
 Clifford Geertz, The Interpretation of Cultures, 1973 (including "Deep Play: Notes on the Balinese Cockfight")
 Ernest Becker, The Denial of Death, 1973
 Giulio Angioni, Tre saggi sull'antropologia dell'età coloniale, 1973
 Talal Asad, Anthropology and the Colonial Encounter, 1973
 Marshall Sahlins, Stone Age Economics, 1974
 Pierre Clastres, Society Against the State, 1974
 John W. Cole and Eric Wolf, The Hidden Frontier: Ecology and Ethnicity in an Alpine Valley, 1974 (republished in 1999 with a new introduction by Eric Wolf)
 Henri Lefebvre, The Production of Space, 1974 (English translation: 1991)
 Claude Meillassoux, Maidens, Meal and Money: Capitalism and the Domestic Community, 1975 (English translation: 1981)
 Michel de Certeau, The Writing of History, 1975 (English translation: 1988)
 Cornelius Castoriadis, The Imaginary Institution of Society, 1975
 Roy Wagner, The Invention of Culture, 1975
 Edward T. Hall, Beyond Culture, 1976
 Marshall Sahlins, Culture and Practical Reason, 1976
 Giulio Angioni, Sa laurera: il lavoro contadino in Sardegna, 1976
 Marvin Harris, Cannibals and Kings, 1977
 Jack Goody, The Domestication of the Savage Mind, 1977
 Jeanne Favret-Saada, Les Mots, la mort, les sorts : la sorcellerie dans le bocage, 1977 (Deadly Words: Witchcraft in the Bocage, 1980)
 Paul Rabinow, Reflections on Fieldwork in Morocco, 1977
 Hans Peter Duerr, Dreamtime: Concerning the Boundary between Wilderness and Civilization Edward Said, Orientalism, 1978
 Marvin Harris, Cultural Materialism: The Struggle for a Science of Culture, 1979
 Bruno Latour and Steve Woolgar, Laboratory Life, 1979

 1980s 

 Steven Feld, Sound and Sentiment: Birds, Weepings, Poetics and Sound in Kaluli Expression, 1982
 Michelle Rosaldo, Knowledge and Passion: Notions of Self and Society among the Ilongot, 1980
 Lila Abu-Lughod, Veiled Sentiments, 1986
 Ulf Hannerz, Exploring the City: Inquiries Toward an Urban Anthropology, 1980
 George Lakoff and Mark Johnson, Metaphors We Live By, 1980
 Eric Wolf, Europe and the People Without History, 1982
 Maurice Godelier, The Making of Great Men, 1982
 Nigel Barley, The Innocent Anthropologist: Notes From a Mud Hut, 1983
 Benedict Anderson, Imagined Communities, 1983
 Eric Hobsbawm and Terence Ranger (editors), The Invention of Tradition, 1983
 Johannes Fabian, Time and the Other: How Anthropology Makes Its Object, 1983
 Louis Dumont, Essays on Individualism: Modern Ideology in Anthropological Perspective, 1983
 Clifford Geertz, Local Knowledge: Further Essays in Interpretive Anthropology, 1983
 Ernest Gellner, Nations and Nationalism, 1983
 Jack Goody, The Development of the Family and Marriage in Europe, 1983
 Maurice Godelier, The Mental and the Material, 1984
 Sidney Mintz, Sweetness and Power, 1985
 James Clifford and George Marcus (editors), Writing Culture: The Poetics and Politics of Ethnography, 1986
 Philippe Descola, La Nature domestique : symbolisme et praxis dans l'écologie des Achuar, 1986
 Clifford Geertz, Works and Lives: The Anthropologist as Author, 1988
 Samir Amin, Eurocentrism, 1988
 David Kertzer, Ritual, Politics, and Power, 1988
 James Clifford, The Predicament of Culture: Twentieth-Century Ethnography, Literature, and Art, 1988
 Bruce Kapferer, Legends of People, Myths of State, 1988
 Adam Kuper, The Invention of Primitive Society: Transformations of an Illusion, 1988 (republished as an expanded and revised new edition, entitled The Reinvention of Primitive Society: Transformations of a Myth in 2005)
 Marilyn Strathern, The Gender of the Gift: Problems with Women and Problems with Society in Melanesia, 1988
 Brackette F. Williams, "A Class Act: Anthropology and the Race to Nation Across Ethnic Terrain", 1989

 1990s 
James Ferguson, The Anti-Politics Machine: "Development", Depoliticization and Bureaucratic Power in Lesotho, 1990
Judith Butler, Gender Trouble, 1990
 Stanley Jeyaraja Tambiah, Magic, Science and Religion and the Scope of Rationality, 1990
 Bruno Latour, We Have Never Been Modern, 1991 (English translation: 1993)
 Donna Haraway, Simians, Cyborgs and Women: The Reinvention of Nature, 1991
 Donald Brown, Human Universals, 1991
 Helena Norberg-Hodge, Ancient Futures: Learning from Ladakh, 1991
 Sharlotte Neely, Snowbird Cherokees , 1991
 Jan Assmann, Cultural Memory and Early Civilization: Writing, Remembrance, and Political Imagination, 1992 (English translation: 2011)
 Marc Augé, Non-Places: Introduction to an Anthropology of Supermodernity, 1992
 Maurice Bloch, Prey into Hunter: The Politics of Religious Experience, 1992
 Eduardo Viveiros de Castro, From the Enemy's Point of View: Humanity and Divinity in an Amazonian Society, 1992
 Jeremy Coote and A. Shelton (eds), Anthropology, Art and Esthetics, 1992
 Mary Douglas, Risk and Blame: Essays in Cultural Theory, 1992
 Annette B. Weiner, Inalienable Possessions: The Paradox of Keeping-While-Giving, 1992.
 Michael Taussig, Mimesis and Alterity: A Particular History of the Senses, 1993
 Fredrik Barth, Balinese Worlds, 1993
 Homi K. Bhabha, The Location of Culture, 1994
 Bernard Stiegler, Technics and Time Michel-Rolph Trouillot, Silencing the Past: Power and the Production of History, 1995
 John Brockman, The Third Culture, 1995
 Raymond Firth, Religion: A Humanist Interpretation, 1996
 Jack Goody, The East in the West, 1996
 Italo Pardo, Managing Existence in Naples: Morality, Action and Structure, 1996
 Hugh Gusterson, Nuclear Rites: a Weapons Laboratory at the End of the Cold War, 1996
 Arjun Appadurai, Modernity at Large, 1996
 Anne Fadiman, The Spirit Catches You and You Fall Down, 1997
 James Clifford, Routes: Travel and Translation in the Late Twentieth Century, 1997
 Akhil Gupta and James Ferguson, Anthropological Locations: Boundaries and Grounds of a Field Science, 1997
 Jeremy Narby, The Cosmic Serpent: DNA and the Origins of Knowledge, 1998
 Stefan Helmreich, Silicon Second Nature: Culturing Artificial Life in a Digital World, 1998
 Aihwa Ong, Flexible Citizenship: The Cultural Logics of Transnationality, 1999

 2000s 
 Sally Merry, Colonizing Hawai'i: The cultural power of law, 2000
 Clifford Geertz, Available Light: Anthropological Reflections on Philosophical Topics, 2000
Gordon Mathews, Global Culture/Individual Identity: Searching for Home in the Cultural Supermarket, 2000
 Patrick Tierney, Darkness in El Dorado, 2000 
Tierney's book was determined to be deliberately fraudulent.
 Tim Ingold, The perception of the environment: essays on livelihood, dwelling and skill, 2000
 Italo Pardo, Morals of Legitimacy: Between Agency and System, 2000
 Frans de Waal, The Ape and the Sushi Master, 2001
 William Ray, The Logic of Culture: Authority and Identity in the Modern Era, 2001
 Vassos Argyrou, Anthropology and the Will to Meaning: A Postcolonial Critique, 2002
 Jone Salomonsen, Enchanted Feminism: The Reclaiming Witches of San Francisco, 2002
 Talal Asad, Formations of the Secular: Christianity, Islam, Modernity, 2003
 Jean Rouch, Cine-Ethnography, 2003
 Theodore C. Bestor, Tsukiji: The Fish Market at the Center of the World, 2004
 Janet Carsten, After Kinship, 2004
 Aihwa Ong and Stephen J. Collier, Global Assemblages: Technology, Politics, and Ethics as Anthropological Problems, 2004
 Anna L. Tsing, Friction: An Ethnography of Global Connection, 2005
 Marcel Detienne, The Greeks and Us: A Comparative Anthropology of Ancient Greece, 2005 (English translation: 2007)
 Jean-Pierre Olivier de Sardan, Anthropology and development. Understanding contemporary social change, 2005
 Nicholas Wade, Before the Dawn: Recovering the Lost History of Our Ancestors, 2006
  Guha Abhijit, Land, Law, and the Left: the Saga of Disempowerment of the Peasantry in the Era of Globalisation]]2007
 Philippe Descola, Beyond Nature and Culture, 2005 (English translation: 2013)
 Paige West, Conservation is our Government now: The Politics of Ecology in Papua New Guinea, 2006
 Veena Das, Life and Words: Violence and the Descent into the Ordinary, 2007
 Andrew Apter, Beyond Words: Discourse and Critical Agency in Africa, 2007
 Paul Rabinow, Marking Time: On the Anthropology of the Contemporary, 2008
 Eugene S. Hunn, A Zapotec Natural History, 2008
 Johannes Fabian, Ethnography as Commentary: Writing from the Virtual Archive, 2008
 Stefan Helmreich, Alien Ocean: Anthropological Voyages in Microbial Seas, 2009
 Giuliana B. Prato (editor), Beyond Multiculturalism, 2009
 Neni Panourgiá, Dangerous Citizens: The Greek Left and the Terror of the State, 2009
 Philippe Bourgeois and Jeff Schonberg, Righteous Dopefiend, 2009

 2010s 
 Margaret Lock and Vinh-Kim Nguyen, An Anthropology of Biomedicine, 2010
 Ulf Hannerz, Anthropology's World: Life in a Twenty-First Century Discipline, 2010
 Jesús Padilla Gálvez, Philosophical Anthropology. Wittgenstein's Perspective. Berlin,  De Gruyter, 2010.  Review 
 David Graeber, Debt: The First 5000 Years, 2011
 Tim Ingold, Being Alive: Essays on Movement, Knowledge and Description, 2011
 Alan Barnard, Social Anthropology and Human Origins, 2011
 James D. Faubion, An Anthropology of Ethics, 2011
 Maurice Bloch, Anthropology and the Cognitive Challenge, 2012
 Jason Ānanda Josephson, The Invention of Religion in Japan, 2012
 Neil L. Whitehead and Michael Wesch (editors) Human No More: Digital Subjectivities, Unhuman Subjects, and the End of Anthropology, 2012
 Eduardo Kohn, How Forests Think: Toward an Anthropology Beyond the Human, 2013
 Italo Pardo and Giuliana B. Prato, Legitimacy. Ethnographic and Theoretical Insights, 2018

 2020s 
 Italo Pardo and Giuliana B. Prato (editors), Urban Inequalities. 2021 
 Petra Kuppinger (editor), Emergent Spaces. 2022

 Thematic bibliography 

 General introductions and histories 
 Eric Wolf, Anthropology, 1964
 Adam Kuper, Anthropology and Anthropologists: The Modern British School, 1973 (3rd revised and enlarged edition, 1996)
 Peter Just and John Monaghan, Social and Cultural Anthropology: A Very Short Introduction, 2000
 Alan Barnard, History and Theory in Anthropology, 2000
 Thomas Hylland Eriksen, What is Anthropology?, 2004
 Aleksandar Bošković, Other People's Anthropologies: Ethnographic Practice on the Margins, 2008
 John S. Gilkeson, Anthropologists and the Rediscovery of America, 1886–1965, 2010
 Fredrik Barth, Andre Gingrich, Robert Parkin, and Sydel Silverman, One Discipline, Four Ways: British, German, French, and American Anthropology (The Halle Lectures), 2005

 Ritual theory 
 Arnold van Gennep, The Rites of Passage, 1909
 Émile Durkheim, The Elementary Forms of the Religious Life, 1912
 Sigmund Freud, Totem and Taboo, 1913
 Erving Goffman, Interaction Ritual, 1967
 Victor Turner, The Ritual Process: Structure and Anti-Structure, 1969
 David Kertzer, Ritual, Politics, and Power, 1988
 Bruce Kapferer, A Celebration of Demons, 1991
 Catherine Bell, Rituals : Perspectives and Dimensions, 1997
 Mario Perniola, Ritual Thinking: Sexuality, Death, World, 2000
 Philippe Buc, The Dangers of Ritual: Between Early Medieval Texts and Social Scientific Theory, 2001
 Robert N. McCauley and E. Thomas Lawson, Bringing Ritual to Mind: Psychological Foundations of Cultural Forms, 2002
 Steven Heine and Dale S. Wright (editors), Zen Ritual: Studies of Zen Buddhist Theory in Practice, 2008

 Cyber anthropology 
 Sherry Turkle, The Second Self: Computers and the Human Spirit, 1984
 Arturo Escobar, "Welcome to Cyberia: Notes on the Anthropology of Cyberculture", 1994
 Sherry Turkle, Life on the Screen: Identity in the Age of the Internet, 1995
 Stefan Helmreich, Silicon Second Nature: Culturing Artificial Life in a Digital World, 1998
 Tom Boellstorff, Coming of Age in Second Life: An Anthropologist Explores the Virtually Human, 2008
 Bonnie Nardi, My Life as a Night Elf Priest. An Anthropological Account of World of Warcraft, 2010. Ann Arbor: University of Michigan Press.
 Daniel Miller, Tales from Facebook, 2011
 Alexander Knorr, Cyberanthropology (in German), 2011
 Neil L. Whitehead and Michael Wesch (editors) Human No More: Digital Subjectivities, Unhuman Subjects, and the End of Anthropology, 2012
 Christine Hine,  Ethnography for the Internet: Embedded, Embodied and Everyday, 2015. London: Bloomsbury Academic.

 Design anthropology 
 Wendy Gunn and Jared Donovan (eds), Design and Anthropology, 2012
 Wendy Gunn, Ton Otto and Rachel Charlotte Smith (eds), Design Anthropology: Theory and Practice, 2013

 Ecological anthropology 
 Julian Steward, Theory of Culture Change: The Methodology of Multilinear Evolution, 1955
 William Balée, Cultural Forests of the Amazon: A Historical Ecology of People and Their Landscapes, 2014

 Economic anthropology 
 Marcel Mauss, The Gift, 1925
 Karl Polanyi, The Great Transformation, 1944
 Marshall Sahlins, Stone Age Economics, 1974
 Claude Meillassoux, Maidens, Meal and Money, 1975
 Italo Pardo, Managing Existence in Naples, 1996
 Karen Ho, Liquidated: An Ethnography of Wall Street, 2009
 David Graeber, Debt: The First 5000 Years, 2011
 Chris Hann and Keith Hart, Economic Anthropology: History, Ethnography, Critique, 2011

 Political anthropology 
 Meyer Fortes and E. E. Evans-Pritchard, African Political Systems, 1940
 James C. Scott, Weapons of the Weak: Everyday Forms of Peasant Resistance, 1985
 Ted Lewellen, Political Anthropology: An Introduction, 2003
 Italo Pardo and Giuliana B. Prato (editors), Citizenship and the Legitimacy of Governance, 2010
 Italo Pardo and Giuliana B. Prato, Legitimacy. Ethnographic and Theoretical Insights, 2018

 Psychological anthropology 
Charles W. Nuckolls, The Cultural Dialectics of Knowledge and Desire. Madison:  University of Wisconsin Press, 1996
 Lindholm, Charles, Culture and Identity. The history, theory, and practice of psychological anthropology, 2007
 Robert, LeVine, Psychological Anthropology: A Reader on Self in Culture, 2010

 Urban anthropology 

 Ulf Hannerz, Exploring the City: Inquiries Toward an Urban Anthropology, 1980
 Italo Pardo and Giulaina B. Prato (eds), The Palgrave Handbook of Urban Ethnography, 2017
 Italo Pardo and Giuliana B. Prato (editors), Urban Inequalities, 2021 
 Petra Kuppinger (editor), Emergent Spaces, 2022

 Linguistic anthropology 

 Johann Gottfried Herder, Treatise on the Origin of Language, 1772
 Wilhelm von Humboldt, On Language: On the Diversity of Human Language Construction and its Influence on the Mental Development of the Human Species, 1836
 Edward Sapir, Language: An Introduction to the Study of Speech, 1921
 Benjamin Lee Whorf, Language, Thought and Reality, 1956 (published posthumously)
 Roman Jakobson, On Linguistic Aspects of Translation, 1959
 Lev Vygotsky, Thought and Language, 1962
 Kenneth Lee Pike, Language in Relation to a Unified Theory of the Structure of Human Behaviour, 1967
 Dell Hymes, Foundations in Sociolinguistics: An Ethnographic Approach, 1974
 Brown, Penny B. & Levinson, Stephen C. Politeness: some Universals in Language Use. (1978) 1987
Gumperz, J.J.  Discourse Strategies, 1982.
 Robert M. W. Dixon, The Rise and Fall of Languages, 1997
 Guy Deutscher, The Unfolding of Language: The Evolution of Mankind's Greatest Invention, 2005

 Biological anthropology 
Biological anthropology is traditionally conceived of as part of the North American four-field approach. In some universities, however, the subject has repositioned itself as human evolutionary biology. In Europe, it is sometimes taught as an individual subject at college level or as part of the discipline of biology. Its methods are informed by evolutionary biology, hence the adjunct biological. Since 1993, the Biological Anthropology Section of the American Anthropological Association has awarded the W.W. Howells Book Award in Biological Anthropology.

 Charles Darwin, On the Origin of Species, 1859
 Thomas Henry Huxley, Evidence as to Man's Place in Nature, 1863
 Alfred Russel Wallace, The Malay Archipelago, 1869
 Charles Darwin, The Descent of Man, and Selection in Relation to Sex, 1871
 Rudolf Virchow, The Freedom of Science in the Modern States, 1877
 Rudolf Virchow, Anthropological Papers, 1891
 Desmond Morris, The Naked Ape, 1967
 Jane Goodall, In the Shadow of Man, 1971
 Richard Dawkins, The Selfish Gene, 1976
 E. O. Wilson, On Human Nature, 1979
 Stephen Jay Gould, The Mismeasure of Man, 1981
 Wade Davis, The Serpent and the Rainbow, 1985
 Robert Boyd and Peter J. Richerson, Culture and the Evolutionary Process, 1985
 Jared Diamond, The Third Chimpanzee, 1991
 Helen Fisher, Anatomy of Love: A Natural History of Mating, Marriage, and Why We Stray, 1992
 Jared Diamond, Guns, Germs, and Steel, 1998
 E. O. Wilson, Consilience: The Unity of Knowledge, 1998
 Sarah Blaffer Hrdy, Mother Nature: A History of Mothers, Infants and Natural Selection, 1999
 Paul Farmer, Pathologies of Power: Health, Human Rights, and the New War on the Poor, 2003
 Jared Diamond, Collapse: How Societies Choose to Fail or Succeed, 2005
 Peter J. Richerson and Robert Boyd, Not by Genes Alone, 2005
Dorothy Cheney and Robert Seyfarth, Baboon Metaphysics, 2007
 Steven Pinker, The Stuff of Thought: Language As a Window Into Human Nature, 2007
 Michael Tomasello, Origins of Human Communication, 2008
 Gregory Cochran and Henry Harpending, The 10,000 Year Explosion: How Civilizations Accelerated Human Evolution, 2009
 Richard Wrangham, Catching Fire: How Cooking Made Us Human, 2009
 Jared Diamond, The World Until Yesterday: What Can We Learn from Traditional Societies?, 2012
 E. O. Wilson, The Social Conquest of Earth, 2012
 Frans de Waal, The Bonobo and the Atheist, 2013

 Archaeology 
Archaeological anthropology is traditionally conceived of as part of the North American four-field approach. With the four-field approach being questioned for its orthodoxy, the subject has gained considerable independence in recent years and some archaeologists have rejected the label anthropology. In Europe, the subject maintains closer connections to history and is simply conceived of as archaeology with a distinct research focus and methodology.

 C. W. Ceram, Gods, Graves and Scholars, 1949
 Steven Mithen, The Prehistory of the Mind: The Cognitive Origins of Art, Religion and Science, 1996
 Julian Thomas, Time, Culture and Identity: An Interpretive Archaeology, 1996
 Chris Gosden, Archaeology & Anthropology: A Changing Relationship, 1999
 Richard Bradley, An Archaeology of Natural Places, 2000
 Alison Wylie, Thinking from Things: Essays in the Philosophy of Archaeology, 2002
 Randall H. McGuire, Archaeology as Political Action'', 2008

Archaeological theory

Some points of reference in related disciplines 
Anthropological research has exerted considerable influence on other disciplines such as sociology, literary theory, and philosophy. Conversely, contemporary anthropological discourse has become receptive to a wide variety of theoretical currents which in turn help to shape the cognitive identity of the subjects. Among the key publications from related disciplines that have advanced anthropological scholarship are:

References

Further reading

 

Anthropology
Anthropology literature